Aviano railway station is a railway station serving the city of Aviano, Italy.

History
The station was inaugurated on October 28, 1930, when it was opened the railway line between Sacile and Pinzano al Tagliamento.

Structure and systems
The passenger building consists of two levels. The building is brick and is painted pink.
In the station there's a cargo terminal with attached warehouse: today (2010) the cargo terminal has been largely dismantled while the warehouse has been converted to storage. The architecture of the warehouse is very similar to that of other Italian railway stations.
The layout of the buildings is rectangular.
The square is composed of two tracks. In detail:
Track 1: on route diverted, is used for crossing and precedence between trains.
Track 2: This is the running line.
Both tracks have platforms connected by a crossing at grade.

External links

Railway stations in Friuli-Venezia Giulia
Railway stations opened in 1930